Folkémon is a studio album by the British folk metal band Skyclad. It is the last album the band recorded with Martin Walkyier as vocalist. As is normal with the band's works under Walkyier, the album's lyrical themes deal with politics, environmentalism, spirituality and personal issues.

The album's title was thought up after one of the band members read in a newspaper that, according to a survey, more children recognised the Pokémon character Pikachu than the current Prime Minister. The theme is continued in the liner notes, with the band members listed, for example, as 'Folkémon trainers'.

The front cover art and the three illustrations in the lyric-booklet are by Duncan Storr, longtime Skyclad collaborator.

Critical reception
Exclaim! wrote that "the sextet prove that metal, fiddles, smart lyrical waxing and the occasional lager can mix neatly; the best examples being the sweet, sweet mayhem of tracks like 'The Great Brain Robbery', 'Think Back and Lie of England', 'The Anti-Body Politic' and 'Any Old Irony?'"

Track listing

Personnel

Skyclad
Martin Walkyier – lead vocals
Steve Ramsey – lead guitar, slide guitar, acoustic guitar, backing vocals
Kevin Ridley – rhythm guitar, acoustic guitar, backing vocals, #2 solo on middle-section of 'The Disenchanted Forest'
Georgina Biddle – keyboards, fiddle, backing vocals
Graeme English – classical guitar, acoustic guitar, bass guitar, backing vocals
Jay Graham – drums, percussion, keyboards, Jew's harp, hunting horn, backing vocals

Additional Musicians
Tirza Abb – "Horny Huntress" on "Polkageist!"
Averre Graham – penny whistle & Cor anglais

References

External links
Folkémon by Skyclad @ Encyclopaedia Metallum

2000 albums
Skyclad (band) albums
Nuclear Blast albums
Albums produced by Kevin Ridley